This is a list of films shot in Malta.

See also 
List of films set in Malta
List of Maltese films

External links 
Malta Film Locations for TV Shows and Movies - krolltravel.com
Movies Made in Malta - moviesmadeinmalta.com
Filmed in Malta - maltafilmcommission.com (and page in the Facebook)

References

Maltese culture
Films
 
Malta
Malta in the arts and media